Antonio Neto may refer to:

Academics
 Antonio H. Castro Neto (born 1964), Brazilian physicist

Politicians
 Antônio de Sousa Neto (1801-1866), Brazilian abolitionist
 António Lino Neto (1873-1961), Portuguese politician
 António Agostinho Neto (1922-1979), 1st President of Angola
 António Alberto Neto (born 1943), Angolan politician
 ACM Neto (born 1979), Brazilian politician

Sportspeople

Association football
 Antônio Mattar Neto (born 1944), Brazilian football midfielder
 António Neto (footballer, born 1971), Angolan football defender
 Antonio Carlos da Silva Neto (born 1985), Brazilian football forward
 Antonio Neto (footballer, born 1989), Brazilian football midfielder

Other sports
 Antônio Braga Neto (born 1987), Brazilian martial artist

See also
 Tufy Pina (born 1989), full name Antonio Pereira Pina Neto, Brazilian football midfielder